Joseph John Saville Garner, Baron Garner  (14 February 1908 – 10 December 1983) was a British diplomat who served as the British High Commissioner to Canada from 1956 to 1961.

Garner was educated at Highgate School (and was later the school's Chairman of Governors from 1976-83). He won a scholarship to Jesus College, Cambridge, where he read Modern and Mediaeval Languages. He joined the Civil Service in 1930, working in the Dominions Office. J. H. Thomas refused to call him by his customary first name ("What sort of fancy name is that? Ain't you got a plainer name?") and called Garner "Joe" instead, a name which stuck. In June 1954 he was working as Deputy Under-Secretary of State, Commonwealth Relations Office when he was made a Knight Commander of the Order of St Michael and St George. 

In 1956, he was appointed High Commissioner to Canada and served in that position until 1961. He was made a Knight Grand Cross of the Order of St Michael and St George on 1 January 1965. At the time he was serving as the Permanent Under-Secretary of State at the Commonwealth Relations Office. He subsequently served as Head of Her Majesty's Diplomatic Service. 

Garner was made a life peer on 21 February 1969, being created Baron Garner, of Chiddingley in the County of Sussex, and assuming his seat in the House of Lords.

References

1908 births
1983 deaths
People educated at Highgate School
Alumni of Jesus College, Cambridge
Life peers
Knights Grand Cross of the Order of St Michael and St George
High Commissioners of the United Kingdom to Canada
Diplomatic peers
Civil servants in the Commonwealth Relations Office
Life peers created by Elizabeth II